Englefeld is a village in the Canadian province of Saskatchewan within the Rural Municipality of St. Peter No. 369 and Census Division No. 15. The village is located 32 kilometres east of the City of Humboldt on Highway 5.

History 
The community was named for Peter Engel, an abbot of Saint John's Abbey, located in Collegeville, Minnesota. It is not known why Engel's name was spelled differently in the village's name. 

The surrounding area was settled by German Catholic immigrants in 1902-1903 who arrived by train at Rosthern. From there travelled 125 miles by horse to the area around Englefeld. Englefeld was one of several communities within the tract known as St. Peter's Colony. By 1904, the Canadian Northern Railway had made its way through the region, as did the telegraph with the telephone eventually arriving in 1916. In 1905, the first church was erected, followed by a general store and lumberyard in 1906 and a post office in February 1907. A hotel was erected in 1909 and the Englefeld school district was formed.  The first grain elevator in the community went up in 1910 with a railway station following in 1912. In 1910 the first fully graded roads were constructed in the community and that same year a livery barn was constructed. A community hall was constructed in 1912 and electric lighting made its debut in the community in 1915.

Englefeld incorporated as a village on June 13, 1916.

Demographics 

Economy 

Koenders Mfg
Schulte Industries

Arts and culture 

Hog Fest - The Englefeld Hog Fest was originally organized by Father Florian Renneberg in 1972. The 40th annual fundraising event brought in 1270 people over July long weekend (July 1–3, 2011) which included Canada day fireworks, carnival/farmers market festivities, culminating in a feast with 16 smoked pigs, and closing out with a pancake breakfast. As part of the 25th Hog Fest (celebrated in 1996) a 7 ft tall (17 ft long) fiberglass pig was erected on top of the Koenders Manufacturing building located in Englefeld along Highway 5.

Englefeld Gallery

See also 

 List of communities in Saskatchewan
 Villages of Saskatchewan

References

External links
Municipal Directory Saskatchewan - Village of Englefeld
Saskatchewan Gen Web - One Room School Project 
Saskatchewan Gen Web Region
Online Historical Map Digitization Project
GeoNames Query 
Fields of prosperity : a history of Englefeld 1903-1987

Villages in Saskatchewan
St. Peter No. 369, Saskatchewan
Division No. 15, Saskatchewan